Kishka or kishke (Belarusian кішка, kishka; Czech Republic  jelito; Slovakia  krvavnica; ; Romanian chişcă; Yiddish קישקע : kishke; Hebrew קישקע; Russian кишка; Ukrainian кишка; also ; Lithuanian vėdarai; Hungarian hurka) refers to various types of sausage or stuffed intestine with a filling made from a combination of meat and meal, often grain or potato. The dish is popular across Eastern Europe as well as with immigrant communities from those areas. It is also eaten by Ashkenazi Jews who prepare their version according to kashrut dietary laws. 

The name  is Slavic in origin, and literally means "gut" or "intestine." It may be related to the Ancient Greek word κύστις : kystis, "bladder" as both words refer to a hollow viscus.

Description

One Eastern European kishka type is kaszanka, a blood sausage made with pig's blood and buckwheat or barley, with pig intestines used as a casing.  Similar to black pudding, it is traditionally served at breakfast.

Kishkas can also be made with an organ meat, such as liver and various grain stuffings. The cooked kishke can range in color from grey-white to brownish-orange, depending on how much paprika is used and the other ingredients. Greater Białystok Area kiszka is usually made in a way very similar to the Jewish kishke, but in the majority of cases, pig intestines are used, and ground potatoes are the main ingredient. There are also vegetarian kishka recipes.

The sausages are popular in areas of the Midwestern United States, where many Poles emigrated. There are numerous mail order companies and delis that sell various kishkas. As blood is often used as an ingredient, kishkas are considered an acquired taste. Kosher kishka recipes omit animal blood and pork products.

Jewish cuisine
Kishke, also known as stuffed derma (from German Darm,  "intestine"), is a Jewish dish traditionally made from flour or matzo meal, schmaltz and spices. In modern cooking, synthetic casings often replace the beef intestine. Kishke is a common addition to Ashkenazi-style cholent.

Prepared kishke is sold in some kosher butcheries and delicatessen; in Israel it is available in the frozen-food section of most supermarkets. Non-traditional varieties include kishke stuffed with rice and kishke stuffed with diced chicken livers and ground gizzards. There are also vegetarian kishke recipes.

The stuffed sausage is usually placed on top of the assembled cholent and cooked overnight in the same pot. Alternatively it can be cooked in salted water with vegetable oil added or baked in a dish, and served separately with flour-thickened gravy made from the cooking liquids.

"Who Stole the Kishka?"
"Who Stole the Kishka?" (originally spelled "Who Stole the Keeshka?") is a polka tune, composed in the 1950s by Walter Dana; lyrics by Walter Solek and recorded and played by various bands. One popular version was familiar to American radio audiences from a 1963 recording by Grammy award-winning polka artist Frankie Yankovic.

Depending on the performer, the song can also include references to other Polish foods such as szynka, chruściki/faworki, pierogi, sernik/serniczek and kielbasa.

See also
 Kaszanka
 Haggis
 Helzel
 Jewish cuisine
 Israeli cuisine

References

External links

 Definition from Merriam-Webster
 Portugal's Sneaky Sausage that Saved Lives (BBC) 

Ashkenazi Jewish cuisine
Slavic cuisine
Precooked sausages
Polish sausages
Belarusian cuisine
Stuffed dishes
Meat and grain sausages